Jan Margo Henne (born August 11, 1947), also known by her married name Jan Hawkins, is an American former competition swimmer, Olympic champion, and former world record-holder.

At the 1968 Summer Olympics in Mexico City, she received four medals including two golds.  Henne won a gold medal by swimming the anchor leg for the winning U.S. team in the women's 4×100-meter freestyle relay.  She and her relay teammates Jane Barkman, Linda Gustavson and Susan Pedersen set a new Olympic record of 4:02.5 in the event final.  She also swam for the gold-medal winning U.S. team in the preliminary heats of the 4×100-meter medley relay, but, under the international swimming rules in effect in 1960, did not receive a medal because she did not participate in the event final.

Individually, Henne won a gold medal for her first-place finish in the women's 100-meter freestyle.  She also received a silver medal for her runner-up finish in the 200-meter freestyle, and a bronze for her third-place performance in the 200-meter individual medley.

After the 1968 Olympics, Henne attended Arizona State University, where she swam for the Arizona State Sun Devils swimming and diving team in Association for Intercollegiate Athletics for Women (AIAW) competition from 1968 to 1972.  She was a member of the Sun Devils' AIAW national championship teams in 1969, 1970 and 1971, and won individual AIAW national championships in the 100-yard breaststroke, 200-yard freestyle and 4x100-yard freestyle relay in 1970.  She was inducted into Arizona State University's sports hall of fame in 1976.

Henne was inducted into the International Swimming Hall of Fame as an "Honor Swimmer" in 1979.

See also

 List of Arizona State University alumni
 List of Olympic medalists in swimming (women)
 World record progression 4 × 100 metres freestyle relay

References

External links
 

1947 births
Living people
American female freestyle swimmers
American female medley swimmers
Arizona State Sun Devils women's swimmers
World record setters in swimming
Sportspeople from Oakland, California
Swimmers at the 1968 Summer Olympics
Medalists at the 1968 Summer Olympics
Olympic gold medalists for the United States in swimming
Olympic silver medalists for the United States in swimming
Olympic bronze medalists for the United States in swimming
20th-century American women
21st-century American women